Malá Domaša is a village and municipality in Vranov nad Topľou District in the Prešov Region of eastern Slovakia.

History
In historical records the village was first mentioned in 1317.

Geography
The municipality lies at an altitude of 140 metres and covers an area of 5.665 km2. It has a population of about 453 people.

External links
 
 
https://web.archive.org/web/20071217080336/http://www.statistics.sk/mosmis/eng/run.html

Villages and municipalities in Vranov nad Topľou District